The Annals of Loch Cé (also Annals of Lough Cé) cover events, mainly in Connacht and its neighbouring regions, from 1014 to 1590. It takes its name from Lough Cé in the kingdom of Moylurg - now north County Roscommon  - which was the centre of power of the Clan MacDermot. In the sixteenth century, the king Brian MacDermot, commissioned the Annals of Loch Ce, which remain among the most important written records of medieval Irish history. For its earliest centuries it used the Annals of Boyle.

The largest part of the Annals are attributed to members of Clan Ó Duibhgeannáin, with some emendations by the patron, Brian na Carraige MacDermot, first MacDermot of the Carrick (died 1592). The text is in Early Modern Irish, with a portion of the text in Latin.

See also
 Irish annals

External links
Annals of Loch Cé (first part, 1014–1348) (translated) at CELT
Annals of Loch Cé (second part, 1349–1590) (translated) at CELT

References

 Oxford Concise Companion to Irish Literature, Robert Welsh, 1996. 

Irish chronicles
Irish manuscripts
16th-century history books
Texts of medieval Ireland
Irish books